was a one-off Hello! Project unit formed in 2004. The members were Maki Goto, Aya Matsuura and Natsumi Abe.

The group was composed of soloists, similar to Gomattou, and released their only single, on October 6, 2004. It reached 4th place on TBS's Top 100 weekly countdown show Count Down TV.

The trio was scheduled to perform together on NHK's 55th Kōhaku Uta Gassen, but Abe was suspended from Hello! Project for plagiarism in December 2004, so Goto and Matsuura had to perform without her. The trio reunited for the "Triangle Energy" concert tour in spring 2005. Both the song itself and in particular the music video for "Ren'ai Sentai Shitsuranger" pay homage to the Japanese Super Sentai franchise. All three members later participated in the similarly themed group Def.Diva.

Discography

DVDs

References

External links 
 Official Hello! Project profile
 Up-Front Works official discography

Japanese musical trios
Japanese idol groups
Japanese girl groups
Japanese pop music groups
Hello! Project groups
Musical groups from Tokyo